Tom Stout (May 20, 1879 – December 26, 1965) was a U.S. Representative from Montana, who represented Montana's at-large congressional district from March 4, 1913, to March 3, 1917.

Stout was born in New London, Missouri, in 1879, and attended the University of Missouri at Columbia, where he studied and later taught law. In 1902, he moved to Lewistown, Montana, and entered publishing, working as the editor and publisher of the Fergus County Democrat from 1902 to 1916 and the Lewistown Democrat News from 1916 to 1946. He was elected to the Montana Senate in 1910, and served until 1913.

Following the 1910 United States Census, Montana gained an additional seat in the United States House of Representatives. Rather than create separate districts, the existing Montana's at-large congressional district began separately electing two members, and Stout ran for Seat B in 1912. He was narrowly elected to the seat and was re-elected in 1914. Stout did not seek re-election in 1916 and returned to Montana, continuing his work in the newspaper business.

From 1930 to 1932, Stout served as a member of the Montana Public Service Commission, and in 1942, he was elected to the Montana House of Representatives. He was subsequently re-elected in 1944 and 1946, and, after he exited the legislature, he worked as an editorial writer for the Billings Gazette from 1947 to 1960. Until his death in 1965, he resided in Billings, Montana.

References

External links 
 

1879 births
1965 deaths
Democratic Party members of the Montana House of Representatives
Democratic Party Montana state senators
University of Missouri alumni
Politicians from Billings, Montana
Democratic Party members of the United States House of Representatives from Montana
People from Ralls County, Missouri
People from Lewistown, Montana